The Fold villages are a group of villages in the Weald of Surrey and Sussex, whose suffix of -fold indicates a common origin as Saxon settlements in cleared areas of woodland.

Such settlements were established on the better-drained soils of the Weald, the word "fold" being derived from the Old English "falod" meaning  a staked-off pasture area. This indicates that the settlers were probably herders of domesticated animals such as sheep, cattle and pigs rather than arable farmers. The same source suggests that such folds were occupied on a seasonal basis with stock being moved by drove roads between the folds and the coastal grazing areas, permanent occupation of the folds being completed by the end of the 12th century. 

Examples of the Fold Villages include Alfold, Dunsfold, Stotfold, Chiddingfold, Slinfold and Runfold.

References

Geography of Sussex
Geography of Surrey
History of Sussex
History of Surrey
Place name element etymologies
English suffixes